Veisjärve (also, simply Järve) is a village in Viljandi Parish, Viljandi County, Estonia. Until the 2017 administrative reform of Estonian municipalities the village was located in Tarvastu Parish. Veisjärve is located on the eastern shore of Lake Veisjärv, 31 km (19 miles) southeast of the town of Viljandi, 12 km (7 miles) southeast of the small borough of Mustla. Neighboring villages include Põrga, Kannuküla, Mäeküla and Kärstna. As of 2011, Veisjärve had a population of 31, a decrease from 66 in the 2000 census.

Veisjärve is the birthplace of Estonian poet Hendrik Adamson (1891–1946).

References

Villages in Viljandi County
Kreis Fellin